Mike Fraser FRSA (born 1975) is a British computer scientist. He is Head of Computer Science at the University of Bristol.

Life and career
Fraser was a student at University of Nottingham from 1993 until 1996 where he acquired his bachelor's degree in Computer Science. He also attained a PhD in Computer Science from the same institution during 1997 and 2000.

After graduating, he worked as a lecturer at the University of Nottingham from 2001 to 2004, before he moved to Bristol and became a senior lecturer at the University of Bristol from 2004.

In 2012, Fraser became a Professor of Human-computer interaction.

In 2019, he was made Head of Computer Science at the University of Bath
, before returning to the University of Bristol in 2022.

Fraser's research is often based around his specialisation in Human-computer interaction.

His first PC was an Amstrad CPC 464.

Awards and recognition
Fraser sits on the steering committee of the TEI conference series, was awarded a ‘best paper’ award at ACM CHI 2005, and is a Fellow of the Royal Society of Arts.

References

1975 births
Living people
British computer scientists
Academics of the University of Bristol
Alumni of the University of Nottingham
Academics of the University of Nottingham